The Xenococcaceae are a family of cyanobacteria.

References

Pleurocapsales
Cyanobacteria families